Jensia yosemitana  is a species of flowering plant in the family Asteraceae known by the common name Yosemite tarweed. It is endemic to California, where it has a scattered distribution across the Sierra Nevada and its foothills. Some of the populations lie inside Yosemite National Park.

Jensia yosemitana is an annual herb with a slender stem up to 25 centimeters (10 inches) tall. The hairy to bristly leaves are 1 to 3 centimeters (0.4-1.2 inches) long and located all along the stem. The inflorescence produces flower heads on thin, threadlike peduncles. The head generally has 2-8 yellow ray florets each about 2 millimeters (0.08 inches) long and 1-7 yellow disc florets with black anthers. The fruit is an achene with a bristly or scaly pappus.

References

External links
United states Department of Agriculture Plants Profile
Calphotos Photo gallery, University of California

Madieae
Endemic flora of California
Plants described in 1882
Flora without expected TNC conservation status